TBCC may refer to:

Tribasic copper chloride, a copper compound widely used as a feed supplement
Thomas Bennett Community College, a comprehensive school in Crawley, West Sussex, England
Tillamook Bay Community College, a community college in Tillamook Bay, Oregon
Turbine-based combined cycle engine, a specific kind of Combined cycle engine
Tom Baker Cancer Centre, Calgary, Alberta, Canada